Leonid Aleksandrovich Zolkin (born 1892; died 1958) was an association football player. He was the brother of Pavel Zolkin.

International career
Zolkin played his only game for the Russian Empire on May 4, 1913 in a friendly against Sweden.

External links
  Profile

1892 births
1958 deaths
Footballers from the Russian Empire
Association football forwards
Russian footballers
Russia international footballers